David Reid (2 May 1896 – March 1963) was a Scottish football player who played for Everton, captained Ballymena to Irish Cup success in 1929 and also managed both sides of the Irish border with Drumcondra and Glentoran.

Early life
The Reid family originally came from the Riccarton area near Kilmarnock in Scotland, but moved to Belfast in 1900. David (who had a twin sister Mary) and siblings including Jimmy, Max and Jack were born in Scotland while Willie and Bob were born in Ulster; all the boys became footballers to some extent.

Reid began his football career alongside his brothers at Distillery in the late 1910s, winning two caps for the Irish League representative side in 1919 and two consecutive County Antrim Shield winners' medals.

Everton
In late May 1920, Everton announced the signing of 23-year-old Reid for a fee of £1,500, having impressed during a representative game between the Irish and English leagues, in which Reid scored.

Reid made his debut against Bradford Park Avenue in August 1920, going on to make 101 appearances for the Toffees, scoring 10 goals during eight seasons at Goodison Park. In February 1928, Reid returned to Northern Ireland to finish the 1927–28 season with Distillery. Everton went onto win the English First Division that season.

Ballymena
Despite having been highly expected to complete a permanent move back to Distillery in the summer of 1928, Reid was convinced to join the new Ballymena team who had been recently formed to compete in the Irish League for the 1928–29 season. He signed for the Light Blues as club captain in June 1928 alongside his older brother John, who had also returned home from fellow Merseyside club, New Brighton. The Braidmen experienced immediate success with a shock win in the 1929 Irish Cup final against Belfast Celtic.

The Ballymena side led by Reid proved their debut season success was no fluke with back-to-back Irish Cup final appearances in 1930 and 1931. His performances for the new side led to a return to the Irish League representative team during the 1929–30 season. During three seasons, Reid made 128 appearances and scored 12 goals at the Ballymena Showgrounds.

Post Ballymena career

In August 1931, Reid took up the position of player-manager at struggling Drumcondra in the League of Ireland. He returned North back to the Irish League for the 1934–35 season, having retired from playing to become manager of Glentoran, but only lasted until September 1934 before resigning his post at The Oval.

Club honours
Distillery
County Antrim Shield winner: 1918–19, 1919–20

Ballymena
Irish Cup winner: 1928–29
Irish Cup runner-up: 1929–30, 1930–31
City Cup runner-up: 1928–29

Statistics

References

1896 births
1963 deaths
Scottish twins
Twins from Northern Ireland
Twin sportspeople
Scottish footballers
Scottish football managers
Everton F.C. players
Drumcondra F.C. players
Ballymena F.C. players
Irish League representative players
English Football League players
Association football midfielders
Association footballers from Northern Ireland
Football managers from Northern Ireland
Footballers from Kilmarnock
Association footballers from Belfast
NIFL Premiership players
NIFL Premiership managers
Glentoran F.C. managers
Lisburn Distillery F.C. players
Association football player-managers
League of Ireland players
League of Ireland managers
Scottish expatriate sportspeople in Ireland
Expatriate association footballers in the Republic of Ireland
Scottish expatriate footballers
Scottish expatriate football managers